Orthocomotis puyoana is a species of moth of the family Tortricidae. It is found in Pastaza Province, Ecuador.

The wingspan is 19 mm. The ground colour of the forewings is cream except for a few white spots at the costa beyond the median cell and a larger spot in the subapical area. The strigulae (fine streaks) and small spots are brownish and the markings are dark brown. The hindwings are dark brown.

Etymology
The species name refers to the type locality, Puyo.

References

Moths described in 2007
Orthocomotis